Islamic views on evolution are diverse, ranging from theistic evolution to Old Earth creationism. Some Muslims around the world believe "humans and other living things have evolved over time", yet some others believe they have "always existed in present form". Some Muslims believe that the processes of life on Earth started from one single point of species with a mixture of water and a viscous clay-like substance. Muslim thinkers have proposed and accepted elements of the theory of evolution, some holding the belief of the supremacy of God in the process. Some scholars suggested that both narratives of creation and of evolution, as understood by modern science, may be believed by modern Muslims as addressing two different kinds of truth, the revealed and the empirical. Others argue that faith and science can be integrated and complement each other.

History

Early views 
In  ('Book of the Animals'), the 9th-century Muslim scholar al-Jāḥiẓ references several facets of natural selection, such as animal embryology, adaptation, and animal psychology. One notable observation al-Jāḥiẓ makes is that stronger rats were able to compete better for resources than small birds, a reference to the modern day theory of the "struggle for existence". Al-Jāḥiẓ also wrote descriptions of food chains.

In 10th century Basra, an Islamic Encyclopedia titled Encyclopedia of the Brethren of Purity introduced the earliest attested evolutionary framework. The Encyclopedia expanded on the Platonic and Aristotelian concept of the great chain of being by proposing a causal relationship advancing up the chain as the mechanism of creation, beginning with the creation of matter and its investment with energy, thereby forming water vapour, which in turn became minerals and "mineral life". Coral, with its branch-like structure, was the highest mineral life which gave rise to lower plants. The date palm was considered the highest plant, giving rise to lower animals, and then through apes came barbarian man, followed by superior man, including the saints and the prophets. Thereafter the chain continues in the traditional form using less causal clarity, with the angels being above man, and above the angels being God as both the originator and the pinnacle. Muhammad Hamidullah summarises this concept found in the work: "Everything begins from Him and everything returns to Him." However, some scholars also criticized and dismissed the Brethren text reading as a proof on pre-Darwinian evolution theory.

According to Sami S. Hawi, the 11th-century Persian scholar Ibn Miskawayh wrote about the evolution of man in his Fawz al-aṣghar.

The 14th-century influential historiographer and historian Ibn Khaldun wrote in the Muqaddimah or Prolegomena ("Introduction") on what he referred to as the "gradual process of creation". Some of Ibn Khaldun's thoughts, according to some commentators, anticipate the biological theory of evolution. Ibn Khaldun asserted that humans developed from "the world of the monkeys", in a process by which "species become more numerous". He believed that humans are the most evolved form of animals, in that they have the ability to reason. He also stated that the Earth began with abiotic components such as "minerals". Slowly, primitive stages of plants such as "herbs and seedless plants" developed and eventually "palms and vines".

Shoaib Ahmed Malik has pointed out that Ibn Khaldun's theory, while remarkable for its acceptance of the kinship between monkeys and humans, should be understood in the context of the late antique and medieval concept of the great chain of being. This theory postulates a linked hierarchy between all entities in creation but is not properly a theory of evolution. The system of the great chain of being implies a graded similarity between the various stages in the hierarchy from minerals to plants, animals, humans, angels, and God, but not a temporal process in which one species originates from the other. While according to some mystical interpretations individual souls may move up the 'ladder' in order to reunite with the divine, the species (or 'substantial forms', in the language of Aristotelian and Neoplatonic ontology) themselves are eternal and fixed. One widely cited quote is taken from a section called The Real Meaning of Prophecy, which argues that prophets occupy a place in the great chain of being just beneath angels. In Ibn Khaldun's view, this explains why individual prophets may temporarily ascend to the rank of angels and share with them in the knowledge of the divine, which they may then bring back to humanity in the form of revelation. According to Malik, interpretations that see in this an early form of scientific evolution theory ought to explain how angels, prophets and the upwards ascent of the soul fit into that theory.

Modern views

19th and 20th centuries 
Evolution was an accepted fact among some Islamic scholarly circles. In his 1874 book titled History of the Conflict between Religion and Science, John William Draper, a scientist and contemporary of Charles Darwin, criticized the Catholic Church for its disapproval of "the Mohammedan theory of the evolution of man from lower forms, or his gradual development to his present condition in the long lapse of time". However, Draper's book has been criticized by more recent scholars as lacking historical accuracy.

In the 19th century, a scholar of Islamic revival, Jamal-al-Din al-Afghānī agreed with Darwin that life will compete with other life in order to succeed. He also believed that there was competition in the realm of ideas similar to that of nature. However, he believed explicitly that life itself was created by God; Darwin did not discuss the origin of life, saying only "Probably all the organic beings which have ever lived on this earth have descended from some primordial form, into which life was first breathed." 

A contemporary of Al-Afghani, Ottoman-Lebanese Sunni scholar Hussein al-Jisr, declared that there is no contradiction between evolution and the Islamic scriptures. He stated that "there is no evidence in the Quran to suggest whether all species, each of which exists by the grace of God, were created all at once or gradually", and referred to the aforementioned story of creation in Sūrat al-Anbiyā.

The late Ottoman intellectual Ismail Fennî, while personally rejecting Darwinism, insisted that it should be taught in schools as even false theories contributed to the improvement of science. He held that interpretations of the Quran might require amendment should Darwinism eventually be shown to be true. 

In Kemalist Turkey, important scholars strove to accommodate the theory of evolution in Islamic scripture during the first decades of the Turkish Republic; their approach to the theory defended Islamic belief in the face of scientific theories of their times. The Saudi Arabian government, on the other hand, began funding and promoting denial of evolution in the 1970s in accordance to its Salafi-Wahhabi interpretation of Islam. This stance garnered criticism from the governments and academics of mainline Muslim countries such as Turkey, Pakistan, Lebanon, and Iran, where evolution was initially taught and promoted.

21st century 
In the contemporary era, a significant minority of Muslims who support evolution exist, but evolution is not accepted by mainstream scholars of the post-colonial Muslim world. However, some scholars argue that evolution is compatible even with a literal reading of the Qur'an. 

Although evolutionary concepts, including natural selection, are presented in the curricula in many Muslim countries, explicit discussion of human evolution is often missing. With the exception of Pakistan, though, religious references are not common in evolutionary science curricula.

Khalid Anees, of the Islamic Society of Britain, discussed the relationship between Islam and evolution in 2004:Islam also has its own school of Evolutionary creationism/Theistic evolutionism, which holds that mainstream scientific analysis of the origin of the universe is supported by the Quran. Many Muslims believe in evolutionary creationism, especially among Sunni and Shia Muslims and the Liberal movements within Islam. Among scholars of Islam İbrahim Hakkı of Erzurum who lived in Erzurum then Ottoman Empire now Republic of Turkey in the 18th century is famous for stating that 'between plants and animals there is sponge, and, between animals and humans there is monkey'.

Contemporary Islamic scholars Ghulam Ahmed Pervez, Edip Yüksel, and T. O. Shanavas in his book, Islamic Theory of Evolution: the Missing Link between Darwin and the Origin of Species, say that there is no contradiction between the scientific theory of evolution and Quran's numerous references to the emergence of life in the universe.

While Muslim scholars reject Young Earth creationism, and claim the story of creation in the Book of Genesis was corrupted, a movement has begun to emerge recently in some Muslim countries promoting themes that have been characteristic of Christian creationists. This stance has received criticism, due to claims that the Quran and Bible are incompatible. 

According to the Guardian newspaper, some British Muslim students have distributed leaflets on campus, advocating against Darwin's theory of evolution. At a conference in the UK in January 2004, entitled Creationism: Science and Faith in Schools, "Dr Khalid Anees, of the Islamic Society of Britain stated that 'Muslims interpret the world through both the Quran and what is tangible and seen. There is no contradiction between what is revealed in the Quran and natural selection and survival of the fittest'." 

Adnan Oktar, also known by his pen-name Harun Yahya, is a Muslim advocate against the theory of evolution. He has been referred to as a "charlatan" by a joint declaration of Muslim scholars, and his representative at a conference on Islam and evolution in January 2013 was ridiculed during and after the conference. Most of Yahya's information is taken from the Institute for Creation Research and the Intelligent Design movement in the United States. Oktar largely uses the Internet to promote his ideas.

Maurice Bucaille, famous in the Muslim world for his commentary on the Quran and science, attempted to reconcile evolution with the Quran by accepting animal evolution up to early hominid species, and then positing a separate hominid evolution leading to modern humans. However, these ideas differ from the theory of evolution as accepted by biologists.

Zakir Naik, a contemporary preacher of Islam and advocate of creationism rejects evolution on the basis that it is only a theory and not a proven fact. Seyyed Hossein Nasr, a prominent Iranian religious scholar, is also a supporter of creationism and refuses evolution for the "chance-like mechanism embedded in the process", the inconsistencies present within, and for the emendations that the theory had undergone since its inception; this view is similarly held by a former pupil of Nasr's, Osman Bakar.

Nuh Ha Mem Keller, a scholar of Islam, is a proponent of the human exceptionalism view of evolution; he believes that evolution is possible only for non-human species, and that humans cannot be viewed through the lens of evolution due to man having been created by Allah with such creation being afforded a special consideration and thus separates man from the evolutional path other living beings go through.

Contemporary scholar Yasir Qadhi believes that the idea that humans evolved is against the Quran, but says that God may have placed humanity perfectly into an evolutionary pattern to give the appearance of human evolution. 

Modern scholar Usaama al-Azami later argued that scriptural narratives of creation, and evolution as understood by modern science, may be believed by modern Muslims as addressing two different kinds of truth, the revealed and the empirical.  

Another scholar, Muneer Al-Ali, argues that faith and science can be integrated and complement each other in explaining the complexity and mysteries of existence.

David Solomon Jalajel, an Islamic author, proclaims an Adamic exceptionalism view of evolution which encourages the theological use of tawaqquf; a tawaqquf is to make no argument for or against a matter to which scripture possesses no declarations for. With tawaqquf, Jalajel believes that Adam's creation does not necessarily signal the beginning of humanity as the Quran makes no declaration as to whether or not human beings were on Earth before Adam had descended. As a result, Jalajel invokes tawaqquf which insinuates that it is possible for humans to exist or not exist before the appearance of Adam on earth with either belief being possible due to the Quran, and that it is possible that an intermingling of Adam's descendants and other humans may or may not have occurred. Thus, the existence of Adam is a miracle since the Quran directly states it to be, but it does not assert there being no humans who could have existed at the time of Adam's appearance on earth and who could have came about as a result of evolution. This viewpoint stands in contrast to creationism and human exceptionalism, ultimately declaring that evolution could be viewed without conflict with Islam and that Muslims could either accept or reject "human evolution on its scientific merits without reference to the story of Adam".

A research paper published in 2016 by the Yaqeen Institute for Islamic Research wrote that there is not a consensus among scholars on how to respond to the theory of evolution, and it is not clear whether the scholars are even qualified scientifically to give a response.

In 2017, Turkey announced plans to end the teaching evolution before the university level, with the government claiming it is too complicated and "controversial" a topic to be understood by young minds.

Rana Dajani, a university professor who teaches evolution in Jordan, wrote that almost all of her students are hostile to the idea of evolution, at the beginning of the class, but by the end of the class, the majority accept the idea of evolution, except when it comes to humans.

Theology 
Unlike the Bible, the story of creation in the Qur'an is not told in one chapter, but rather can be pieced together from verses all over the book.

Creation of the universe 
Some modern-day Muslim scholars advocate for interpreting the term al-sama, traditionally believed to be a reference to both the sky and the seven heavens, as also referring to the universe as a whole. Therefore, they argue that the Quran confirms the Big Bang in Sūrat al-Anbiyāʼ, where the Quran states that "the heavens and the earth were a single body" before being parted: 

This view that the Qu'ran references the initial singularity of the Big Bang is also accepted by Muslim scholars such as Muhammad Tahir-ul-Qadri and Muhammad Asad. Many Muslims interpret the Quran's story of the creation of the world in the context of science, and some scholars such as Faheem Ashraf of the Islamic Research Foundation International, Inc. and Sheikh Omar Suleiman of the Yaqeen Institute for Islamic Research argue that the scientific theory of an expanding universe is described in Sūrat adh-Dhāriyāt:

Some modern scholars understand that the "smoke/gas" mentioned in Surah Fussilat could be referring to the state few minutes after the Big Bang when the universe was primarily hot Hydrogen and Helium:

The time period described is 6 periods for this whole creation, most Muslims hold the view that, these 6 days are not solar days rather a different relative time, which starts from the beginning of universe.

The Fatimid Muslim thinker al-Mu’ayyad fi’l-Din al-Shirazi rebukes the idea of the creation of the world in 6 solar days of either 24 hours, 1000 or 50,000 years. He questions both how creation can be measured in units of time when time was yet to be created, as well as how an infinitely powerful Creator can be limited by the constraints of time, as time itself is part of his own creation.

The word  is understood, within the Qur'an, to be a long period of time—an era or eon. Therefore, Muslims interpret the description of a "six days" creation as six distinct periods or eons. The length of these periods is not precisely defined, nor are the specific developments that took place during each period. Mustafa Khattab in his Quranic translation states that "The word is not always used in the Quran to mean a 24-hour period. According to 22:47, a heavenly Day is 1000 years of our time. The Day of Judgment will be 50 000 years of our time (see 70:4). Hence, the six Days of creation refer to six eons of time."

The concept of a "day of rest" does not appear in the Quran, and in fact the concept that God needed rest after the creation from tiredness is explicitly denied in a verse:

Creation of life 
The emergence of life is mostly mentioned in Quran during discussion of creation of man. According to Quran the life has its origins from a single being, with some modern adherents considering it as the LUCA. The Quran states that every human's existence starts from extract of organic soil. The only explicit reference to the creation of non-human life in the Quran appears in Sūrat al-Anbiyāʼ, in which the Quran proclaims "We made out of water every living thing". According to Muhammad Asad, "only water has the peculiar properties necessary for the emergence and development of life."

Creation of humanity 
The first beings, Âdam and his wife (in Islamic tradition called Ḥawwāh: the Arabic for Eve), appear in the Quran as the first man and woman. The Quran states that they were created from water and extract of altered clay. This mixture is said to have been given time for it to develop and was brought to life by the blowing of soul into their bodies followed by the event of mass prostration to Adam and castration of prominent Jinns like Iblis. Some Islamic scholars proposed that the verses could have multiple interpretations metaphorically, as the Quran supports the idea that some verses have multiple meanings.

The majority of Islamic scholars, including Yasir Qadhi, believe that Adam and Eve were naturally created through a miracle by God. Caner Taslaman, Mohamed Ghlian, Yaşar Nuri Öztürk, Adnan Ibrahim, Ghulam Ahmed Pervez, Edip Yüksel, and other modern and classical Islamic scholars have at times instead argued that the pair evolved naturally from a common ancestor. Some scholars stated that they believe in evolution, but they also argued that Adam and Eve were the only two exceptions that were created without an evolutionary process.

In modern times, there has been increased support for the idea that humans evolved. Many Muslims base their belief of this idea on a chapter in the Quran, which says:

While the evolutionist scholars argue this may refer to proto-human ancestors humans evolved from, the creationist scholars argue that the "predecessors" refer to those civilizations who have lived before.

Statistics 
A 2000 study conducted by a researcher of the University of Oklahoma found that 19% of participants believed that Islam's tenets were not at odds with Darwin's theory of evolution while 81% believed there to be some form of conflict between Islam and Darwinism. One of the participants, an Islamic teacher, stood in opposition to the theory of evolution although was willing to accept certain aspects that were proposed by it. The participants who believed there to be no conflict between Islam and Darwin's theory of evolution were split as it pertained to the possible relationship between primates and humans with only 6% of participants seeing no issue with the assertion.

As per a 2008 report, evolutionary biology was included in the high-school curricula of most Muslim countries. Science foundations of 14 Muslim countries, including Pakistan, Iran, Turkey, Indonesia, and Egypt, recently signed a statement by the Interacademy Panel (IAP, a global network of science academies), in support of the teaching of evolution, including human evolution.

A 2009 survey conducted by the McGill researchers and their international collaborators found that 85% of Indonesian high school students and 86% of Pakistani high school students agreed with the statement, "Millions of fossils show that life has existed for billions of years and changed over time." However, in Indonesia, creationism is common among older residents, even among biology teachers and biology education professors.

According to a 2013 Pew study, the numbers of Muslims who support evolution appear to be increasing slowly but steadily. For instance, a large majority of people accept human evolution in Kazakhstan (79%) and Lebanon (78%), but relatively few in Afghanistan (26%) and Iraq (27%), with most of the other Islamic countries somewhere in between.

Ahmadiyya views of evolution 

The Ahmadiyya community's view of evolution is that of universal acceptance, albeit divinely designed. The movement actively promotes god-directed "evolution".  Over the course of several decades the movement issued various publications in support of the scientific concepts behind evolution.

Teaching of evolution 
According to Rana Dajani  adopting new ways of thinking to pursue  the knowledge is a core tenet of Islam. Dajani  says interpretation of Quran being a fluid and ongoing process of human exercise can, always, be revisited to clear contradictions, if any arise during pursuits of scientific knowledge.  According to Dajani interaction with modernization and globalization has imported some problematical hostile attitudes towards science like rejection of the theory of evolution into Muslim societies. Dajani says the negative attitudes among Muslims towards evolution came post twentieth century associating Darwin with western colonialism materialism and racism, but actually rudimentary theories of evolution were proposed by Muslim scholars right from ninth century even up to 1880s. Dajani  says while some Muslim students think accepting theory of evolution means denying existence of God, but that need not be so rather after initiation of God, universe can evolve according to principles of science and logic. Dajani  says usually a detailed explanation of natural evolution of plants, artificial breeding, antibiotic resistance, development of modern medicines and vaccines,  helps Muslim students accept evolution  still some reservations remain in accepting human evolution; here Dajani  says Muslims are warned against arrogance and need to understand humans are part of rest of the creation. Dajani  says, as a scientist, Charles Darwin contributed to human understanding  of the emergence and diversification of life on the Earth and that evolution is right mechanism to explain diversity and the development of species. Dajani  says discussion of controversial topic of evolution helps Muslim students avoid blind acceptance of status quo and question even other aspects of their lives.

See also
 Religious interpretations of the Big Bang theory#Islam – Islamic interpretations of the Big Bang theory
 History of evolutionary thought#Islamic philosophy and the struggle for existence – Early evolutionary thoughts in Islam

Further reading

References

External links

Science in the Quran, by Ashraf Salmawi
The Muslim Responses to Evolution by Abdul Majid
Quran Evolution and Intelligent Design, by S. Nemmers
In the Muslim world, creationism is on the rise Boston.com

 
Contemporary Islamic philosophy
Islam and science